Alex J. Meunier (November 9, 1897November 8, 1983) was an American educator and Republican politician.  He served eight years in the Wisconsin State Senate and six years in the State Assembly, representing Door County and northeastern Wisconsin.

Biography

Meunier attended the Algoma Teachers College, and taught in Door County schools for nine years. He also served in the U.S. Army, and operated his own orchard. He was a delegate to the Republican National Convention in 1943, and 1949. He died at a hospital in 1983.

References

External links 
 Alex J. Meunier biography in the 1970 Wisconsin Blue Book

1897 births
1983 deaths
Republican Party Wisconsin state senators
Republican Party members of the Wisconsin State Assembly
People from Door County, Wisconsin
20th-century American politicians